The molecular formula C19H20N2O2 (molar mass: 308.37 g/mol, exact mass: 308.1525 u) may refer to:

 Phenylbutazone
 GTS-21 (DMXBA)

Molecular formulas